Spirit of Speed 1937 is a racing video game developed by Broadsword Interactive. The game was originally released in 1999 exclusively in Europe by Hasbro Interactive, who released the game under the MicroProse brand name. In 2000 the game was ported to the Dreamcast, and was published by Acclaim Entertainment under the LJN banner, five years after LJN was shut down by Acclaim. This version saw a North American release, and was released there on June 27, 2000. Spirit of Speed 1937 takes gamers back to the 1930s when motorsports were in their infancy and drivers raced for the thrill of speed, the danger, and the glamor that came with it.

Gameplay
Spirit of Speed 1937 features 15 classic vehicles, including the first twin-supercharged single-seat racer, the Alfa Romeo P3. Also featured are the twin V8 Alfa Romeo Bimotore designed by none other than Scuderia Ferrari, the Alfa Romeo 12C, the Auto Union Type C that was designed by the legendary Ferdinand Porsche, and the Auto Union Type D.

Players race around nine legendary courses located in Melhalla (Libya), AVUS (Germany), Montana (U.S.), Roosevelt Raceway (U.S.), Montlhéry (France), Pau (France), Donington (England), Brooklands (England), and Monza (Italy).

Spirit of Speed 1937s modes of play are Single Race, Championship Season, and Scenario. Single Race allows players to select a car and course to race on. Championship Season is where users take part in a series of races in an attempt to win the title. Scenario is a mode that sets up a historic racing moment for the player to experience. Each mode is broken into three separate difficulties but none of them include a two-player feature. Along with the standard controller, the game also supports arcade sticks and steering wheels.

Reception

The Dreamcast version received unfavorable reviews according to the review aggregation website GameRankings. IGNs Jeremy Dunham called it "the poorest excuse for a Dreamcast game I have ever laid eyes on", harshly criticizing nearly every aspect of the game, including the load times, course designs, control, and graphics. GameSpots Frank Provo criticized the sound effects and the visuals of the game. In Japan, however, where the game was ported and published by Acclaim Japan on April 5, 2001, Famitsu gave it a score of 25 out of 40.

GameSpot named it the Worst Video Game of 2000 – the first year the award was given for console games.

Conversely, DC Swirl gave the game 3 out of 5 swirls, commending the accurate portrayal of auto racing of the period, and approving the price ($20) of which the game was retailed. HappyPuppy gave a rating of 6.5/10 and a mixed review criticizing the gameplay but complimenting the graphics. Argentine magazine Next Level gave the game 70%, approving the low price and the authentic representation of themes of the era. Spain-based magazine Super Juegos gave a better score of 72. GF3K.com gave a far better score of 7.8 out of 10, praising the controls, sound, and the game's accuracy in portraying vintage racing cars.

References

External links

1999 video games
Acclaim Entertainment games
Cancelled Game Boy Advance games
Dreamcast games
LJN games
Multiplayer and single-player video games
Racing video games set in the United States
Video games developed in the United Kingdom
Video games set in 1937
Video games set in Africa
Video games set in Europe
Windows games
Broadsword Interactive games